Mayday is a 2005 American made-for-television thriller film based on the 1979 novel by American author Thomas Block. The novel was updated in 1998 by authors Thomas Block and Nelson DeMille and re-released as a paperback. The film was directed by T. J. Scott and stars Aidan Quinn, Gail O'Grady, Dean Cain, Charles Dutton, Michael Murphy and Kelly Hu. It aired on CBS in the United States on October 2, 2005.

Plot
A state-of-the-art supersonic passenger jet is flying from San Francisco to Tokyo. At  12 miles above the Pacific Ocean, the Pacific Global Flight 52 is struck by an errant U.S. Navy missile that cripples the aircraft. The missile has killed the flight crew, and left almost all of the other crew and most of the passengers dead, near death, or psychologically deranged.

A handful of survivors on the airliner must now have to achieve the impossible: to land the aircraft despite weather, intrigues and technical problems. While terror and hysteria begin to increase for those on board, John Berry (Aidan Quinn), a weekend pilot is forced to take control of the airliner and navigate it to safety. Meanwhile, the U.S. military, Anne Metz (Gail O'Grady), a representative from the insurance company and executives from the Pacific Global Airline are all working to keep the incident a secret. U.S. Navy Commander James Sloan (Dean Cain) sends Lt. Peter Matos (James Thomas) to destroy the crippled airliner, but the pilot disobeys his orders.

U.S. Navy Admiral Randolf Hennings (Charles S. Dutton) also defies his superiors and pledges to tell the true story of the accident in his report to the Pentagon. Berry and flight attendant Sharon Crandall (Kelly Hu) survive another attempt to down the aircraft and eventually manage to control the stricken airliner and bring it back to a safe landing in San Francisco.

Cast
 Aidan Quinn as John Berry
 Dean Cain as Commander James Sloan
 Kelly Hu as Sharon Crandall
 Charles S. Dutton as Admiral Randolf Hennings
 Michael Murphy as Captain Randall Williams
 Gail O'Grady as Anne Metz
 Sasha Roiz as Wayne Johnson
 Richard FitzPatrick as Jack Miller
 Tamara Hope as Linda Farley
 Gabriel Hogan as Daniel McVary
 Victoria Pratt as Simms
 Ron Lea as Harold Stein
 Matt Aquin as David Henderson
 Martin Roach as Carl Fessell
 Matt Gordon as Carson Evans
 Carin Moffat as Lieutenant Robin Ballantine
 Richard Yearwood as Ensign Kyle Eggers
 Michael McLachlan as Ensign Sam Nichols
 Sarah Orenstein as Amy Stein
 Charlotte Corbeil-Coleman as Erica Stein
 Deborah Odell as Rahcel Seymour
 Jonas Chernick as Mickey King
 Vick Sahay as Talk Ito
 Mike Realba as Stuart Henderson
 Jonathan Keltz as Dough Berry
 Karen Robinson as Marlene Cobb
 Darren Hynes as Barry Townley Freeman
 Leigh Bianco as Barabara
 James Thomas as Lieutenant Peter Matos
 Katie Bergin as Lieutenant Owen
 Brian Kaulback as Ground Controller
 Bryon Mumford as Paramedic
 Jane Luk as Attendant

Production
Originally developed with TNT Network for the 2003-2004 season, the Mayday project was picked up for production for the 2005-2006 CBS season. Principal photography took place in Toronto, Ontario, Canada by Chautauqua Entertainment and the Jerry Leider Co. in association with Paramount Network TV, at the Toronto Film Studios. Filming took place from July 9, 2005 with shooting completed on August 6, 2005.

Reception
Mayday was reviewed by Brian Lowry for Variety; he said: "Although "Mayday" is based on a bestselling novel, it's hard to escape the distracting sense that it feels like a sober-minded update of "Airplane!," what with a weekend pilot and attractive stewardess forced to land a wounded plane filled with incapacitated passengers."

References

External links
 
 
 

2005 television films
2005 films
2005 thriller films
2000s American films
2000s English-language films
American aviation films
American thriller television films
CBS network films
Films about aviation accidents or incidents
Films based on American thriller novels
Films directed by T. J. Scott
Films scored by Sean Callery
Films shot in Toronto
Television films based on books